Llyn Brenig is a reservoir located on Denbigh Moors in North Wales. The artificial lake, which was constructed between 1973 and 1976, was created by building an embankment dam across the Afon Brenig valley. It is used to manage the flow in the River Dee as part of the River Dee regulation system.

The reservoir's purpose is to protect the water supply  for North West England and north-east Wales, particularly Liverpool and its surrounding area. Its surface area of  makes it the fourth largest lake in Wales, behind Bala Lake (Llyn Tegid), Llyn Trawsfynydd and Lake Vyrnwy.

History
Construction began in 1973 and was completed in 1976. The northern half of the reservoir is in community of Nantglyn.

Brenig, which has a capacity of 60 million m³, was first filled in 1979. Water supply of the catchment into the lake is significantly "over-reservoired", this means the catchment area of Llyn Brenig does not have capacity to refill the reservoir within one annual hydrological cycle. It can take several years for the reservoir to refill again after its water level have been drawn down.  Water is only drawn from Llyn Brenig during drought conditions when Llyn Celyn and Bala Lake are no longer predicted to be capable of maintaining the flow in the River Dee.

Commercial logging is conducted around parts of the lake.

Leisure 
Llyn Brenig is a popular destination for outward bound activities such as hiking and mountain biking, fishing and watersports. It has a visitor centre and cafe.

Watersport activities

Sailing, fishing, canoeing and water zorbing are all permitted on the lake. The only permitted power craft are those used by anglers, rangers, and sailing club safety craft. In 1990 Llyn Brenig was the only Welsh reservoir used for the World Fly Fishing Championships.

Archeology

During construction of the Llyn Brenig, archeologist found that the Afon Brenig valley had been used for thousand of years by upland communities crossing the Denbigh Moors. Finds included a camp used by Mesolithic people (radiocarbon analysis of the charcoal from their fires to around 5700 BC), Bronze Age artifacts, a ring cairn (a Bronze Age burial mound), and several barrows. There are a number of archaeological trails around Llyn Brenig.

Ospreys
A pair of ospreys began breeding at the lake in 2018, becoming the fifth site in Wales. In 2020 filming of The Bridge, a Channel 4 reality television programme, may have disturbed the ospreys during the breeding season. In April 2021, vandals cut down the osprey nest platform with a chainsaw. The same pair of ospreys returned to Llyn Brenig in 2022 and hatched chicks at a replacement nest in the same location.

References

External links
Clwyd-Powys Archaeological Trust
Llyn Brenig Sailing Club
Welsh Water Website
North Wales Wildlife Trust Ospreys at Llyn Brenig

Brenig
Brenig
River regulation in Conwy County Borough
River regulation in Denbighshire
RBrenig